The 2018 CARIFTA Games took place between 31 March and 2 April 2018. The event was held at the Thomas Robinson Stadium in Nassau, Bahamas.

Medal summary

Boys U-20 (Junior) 

†: Open event for both junior and youth athletes.

Girls U-20 (Junior)

†: Open event for both junior and youth athletes.

Boys U-18 (Youth)

Girls U-18 (Youth)

Medal table

References

External links 
Official website (archived)

CARIFTA Games
CARIFTA Games
CARIFTA Games
CARIFTA Games
CARIFTA Games
International sports competitions hosted by the Bahamas
March 2018 sports events in North America
April 2018 sports events in North America